Garnell W. Whitfield, Jr. is the former fire commissioner of the Buffalo Fire Department in Buffalo, New York and a social justice advocate. He received national attention for spreading awareness of white supremacy and domestic terrorism after his mother, Ruth Whitfield, was killed in the 2022 Buffalo shooting.

Early life and career
Whitfield was born in Buffalo, New York to Ruth Whitfield and Garnell W. Whitfield, Sr.

He started working as a firefighter in the Buffalo Fire Department in 1984. Throughout his career, he served as the city fire departments's chief fire administrator, deputy commissioner of administration and deputy commissioner of emergency services.

In January 2010, Mayor of Buffalo Byron Brown appointed Whitfield as the commissioner of the Buffalo Fire Department after the resignation of commissioner Michael Lombardo. He was unanimously approved by the Buffalo Common Council.

Whitfield retired from the Buffalo Fire Department in 2017. Governor Andrew Cuomo then appointed Whitfield as the assistant commissioner of the New York Department of Homeland Security and Emergency Services, where he served from September 2017 until September 2019.

2022 Buffalo shooting
His mother, Ruth Whitfield, was the oldest victim of the 2022 Buffalo shooting that occurred at a Tops Friendly Markets supermarket in the East Side neighborhood of Buffalo. He said he had been calling his mother and trying to locate her, until he found her car in the parking lot of the Tops Supermarket where the shooting occurred.

She was 86 years old when the shooting occurred. Her funeral was attended by Vice President Kamala Harris and her husband, Douglas Emhoff.  The Vice President met with Whitfield before his mother's funeral service.

In an effort to raise awareness of white supremacy and domestic terrorism in the United States, Whitfield testified in the United States Senate Judiciary Committee.

Whitfield appeared on news outlets after the shooting alongside prominent civil rights attorney Benjamin Crump, who he retained for legal counsel in the wake of shooting.

In June 2022, Whitfield was featured as a speaker at the March for Our Lives protest held in Washington, D.C.

Personal life
Whitfield is married to his wife, Cassieta.  They live in the East Side neighborhood of Buffalo.

He is a Christian.

References

Living people
 
People from Erie County, New York
Year of birth missing (living people)